Tir Kola (also Romanized as Tīr Kolā) is a village in Esbu Kola Rural District, in the Central District of Babol County, Mazandaran Province, Iran. At the 2006 census, its population was 195, in 41 families.

References 

Populated places in Babol County